Naphtali Lau-Lavie (sometimes Naphtali Lavie) (1926 – December 6, 2014) was an Israeli journalist, author, and diplomat.

Biography
Lavie's entire family was murdered during the Holocaust, with the exception of his brother, Yisrael, who would later become the Chief Rabbi of Israel.

Diplomatic and political career
Lavie served as a spokesman for Moshe Dayan, Shimon Peres, and Yitzhak Shamir. In 1981, he was appointed Israel's consul-general in New York City.

Journalism and literary career
Lavie was the author of several books.

References

1926 births
2014 deaths
People from Piotrków Trybunalski
Polish emigrants to Mandatory Palestine
Israeli people of Polish-Jewish descent
Israeli consuls
Israeli journalists
Auschwitz concentration camp survivors
Buchenwald concentration camp survivors
Israeli expatriates in the United States